Stuart Alexander & Co Pty Ltd is a privately owned, wholly Australasian company founded in 1884. 
Stuart Alexander imports, markets, distributes and owns a range of premium fast-moving consumer goods (FMCGs) and brands throughout Australasia.

Trusted to grow international brands for over 125 years
Stuart Alexander's corporate philosophy is to establish, build and develop consumer brands to become household names. With over 125 years of experience working in the Australasian marketplace, Stuart Alexander has extensive expertise in marketing, sales and distribution.

An established and evolving portfolio
Today, Stuart Alexander represents a variety of big names in food and confectionery from around the world, such as Tabasco, Mentos, and Fisherman's Friend.

See also

List of oldest companies in Australia

References

External links

 Stuart Alexander and Co.'s profile at foodanddrinkdigital.com
 Company info at Bloomberg BusinessWeek website

Australian companies established in 1894
Food and drink companies established in 1894
Companies based in Sydney